Concepción de Buena Esperanza (best known as Concepción del Bermejo) was a Spanish city that existed between 1585 and 1632 in current Chaco Province, Argentina. During its time it was of the most important cities in Río de la Plata government. Major economical activities were cotton, wax and commercial activities; Concepción was a must step in the road between Asunción del Paraguay and San Miguel de Tucumán. Between 1631 and 1632 was attacked by local Indians, who made that local inhabitants leave the city and ran away to Corrientes.

References

Chaco Province
Destroyed cities
1585 establishments in the Spanish Empire
Populated places established in 1585